The year 1796 in architecture involved some significant events.

Events
 October 8 – The Sans Souci Theatre in Westminster, London, opens to the public, built by dramatist, musician and painter Charles Dibdin.

Buildings and structures

Buildings
 Somerset House in London, designed by William Chambers is completed.
 The parish church of Urtijëi in the Italian Tyrol, designed by Joseph Abenthung, is completed.
 Hwaseong Fortress in Suwon, Korea, designed by Jeong Yak-yong, is completed.
 Work begins on Blaise Castle, commissioned by John Scandrett Harford from William Paty.
 Ffynone House near Boncath in Wales, designed by John Nash, is largely completed.
 The Mosque of Amr ibn al-As in Fustat, Egypt, is rebuilt by Mamluk leader Mourad Bey.

Births
 date unknown – Mortimer Lewis, Colonial Architect of New South Wales (died 1879)

Deaths
 January 11 – Jacob Otten Husly, Dutch neoclassical architect (born 1738)
 March 1 – Carl Fredrik Adelcrantz, Swedish architect and civil servant (born 1716)
 March 10 – William Chambers, English architect and Surveyor-General and Comptroller of the King's Works (born 1723)

Architecture
Years in architecture
18th-century architecture